The 1998 Dynasty Cup, also known as The 4th AFC Marlboro Dynasty Cup '98 due to sponsorship reasons, was a football competition for the top four teams of East Asia. The fourth and final edition of the Dynasty Cup was held from March 1, 1998, to March 7, 1998, in Tokyo and Yokohama, Japan. The competition was won by Japan for the third straight time.

Participating teams

Venues

Matches detail

References

1998 Dynasty Cup at Rsssf

1998
1998 in Asian football
1997–98 in Hong Kong football
1998 in Chinese football
1998 in Japanese football
1998 in South Korean football
1998